Bridges is an album by Gil Scott-Heron and Brian Jackson, released in the fall of 1977 on Arista Records.

"We Almost Lost Detroit"
The song "We Almost Lost Detroit", which shares its title with the 1975 John G. Fuller book of the same name, recounts the story of the nuclear meltdown at the Enrico Fermi Nuclear Generating Station in Frenchtown Township near Monroe, Michigan, in 1966. It was performed at the No Nukes concert in September 1979 at Madison Square Garden. This song was also contributed to the No Nukes album in November 1979 and No Nukes concert film in May 1980.

Track listing

Personnel
Gil Scott-Heron - Lead Vocals, Guitar, Piano
Brian Jackson - Flute, Keyboards, T.O.N.T.O.
Danny Bowens - Bass
Joe Blocker, Reggie Brisbane - Drums
Fred Payne, Marlo Henderson - Guitar
Tony Duncanson, Barnett Williams - Percussion
Bilal Sunni Ali - Saxophone
Delbert Tailor - Trumpet

Charts

Legacy
The song "We Almost Lost Detroit" is sampled by:
"Brown Skin Lady" by Black Star on Mos Def & Talib Kweli Are Black Star 
"The People" by Common on Finding Forever
 The song "We Almost Lost Detroit" is covered by Dale Earnhardt Jr. Jr. on their album It's a Corporate World (2011).

References

External links
 Gil Scott-Heron & Brian Jackson-Bridges at Discogs

1977 albums
Gil Scott-Heron albums
Albums produced by Larry Fallon
Albums produced by Tom Wilson (record producer)
Arista Records albums
Collaborative albums